A constitutional referendum was held in East Germany on 6 April 1968. The new constitution was approved by 96.4% of voters, with turnout reported to be 98.1%, and came into force on 9 April.

Background
On 1 December 1967 the Volkskammer established a commission to draw up a new constitution. This was by the Volkskammer with no dissenting votes on 26 March 1968, alongside a law on conducting a referendum to approve the constitution.

Results

References

1968 referendums
1968 in East Germany
Referendums in East Germany
Constitutional referendums
April 1968 events in Europe